Doğan (Turkish: Falcon) is a Turkish origin masculine given name and a surname. It may also refer to:

 Doğan class fast attack craft, a Fast Attack Craft/Missile Boat class of the Turkish Navy
 Doğan Group Companies, a part of Doğan Media Group
 Doğan Media Group, a Turkish media conglomerate, part of Doğan Holding
 Doğan Holding, an industrial conglomerate in Turkey
 Doğan Seyfi Atlı Stadium, a football stadium in Denizli, Turkey
 Doğan Türk Birliği, a sports club based in Girne, Northern Cyprus
 MV Karadeniz Powership Doğan Bey, a Liberia-flagged floating power plant, owned and operated by a Turkish company
 Bulgarian name for Avia B-534 1930s fighter
 Doğan, Buldan, village in Turkey